Angela guianensis is a species of praying mantis from the genus Angela of the family Mantidae. It was first described by the entomologist Rehn in 1906.

Specimens can be found in French Guiana, Bolivia, Brazil, Costa Rica, Guyana, Colombia, Surinam, and Venezuela.

References

Mantidae
Insects described in 1906
Insects of South America